The 600-footers were a class of lake freighters all built to the design of the J. Pierpont Morgan.
The J. Pierpont Morgan was launched in April, 1906, and was, at the time, the longest vessel on the Great Lakes.

Her sister ships were not all identical.  Minor modifications were made.  Mark L. Thompson, author of Queen of the Lakes, wrote that between 56 and 76 vessels were built to this design.

The 600-footers could use harbours that larger  seawaymax vessels can't use.  Until 1961 no vessel longer than 600 feet was able to access Cleveland's harbour.

They were powered by triple expansion steam engines, providing , and could carry 11,000 tons of cargo. They cost $440,000 to construct, in 1906 dollars.

References

+
Merchant ships of the United States
Steamships of the United States